Alec Coppel (17 September 1907 – 22 January 1972) was an Australian-born screenwriter, novelist and playwright. He spent the majority of his career in London and Hollywood, specialising in light thrillers, mysteries and sex comedies. He is best known for the films Vertigo (1958), The Captain's Paradise (1953), Mr Denning Drives North (1951) and Obsession (1949), and the plays I Killed the Count and The Gazebo.

Biography

Early life
Coppel was born in Melbourne and attended Wesley College. He moved to England in the 1920s to study medicine at Cambridge University, but dropped out before graduating and went to work in advertising, writing in his spare time.  Coppel's first stage plays were Short Circuit (1935) and The Stars Foretell (1936).

I Killed the Count
His first big success was his play I Killed the Count (1937), which had a successful run in the West End. Coppel turned it into a novel (1939), screenplay and radio play. It also led to him receiving screenwriting offers.

His script credits include Over the Moon (1939), the film version of I Killed the Count (1939), and Just like a Woman (1939). Coppel contributed to the book of a revue, Let's Pretend (1940), and wrote a new play, Believe It Or Not (1940).

Return to Australia
Coppel returned to Australia in 1940 for his "health". While there he co-founded and worked as a director for Whitehall Productions, operating out of the Minvera Theatre in Kings Cross.

Among the plays he presented there was the world premiere of his own Mr Smart Guy (1941). He also wrote for radio and contributed to the script of Smithy (1946), one of the few feature films made in Australia during this time.

Return to London
Coppel moved back to London towards the end of the war, and continued to alternate between novels, plays and screenplays.

His plays included My Friend Lester (1947) and A Man About a Dog (1949). His scripts included Brass Monkey (1948), Woman Hater (1948), Obsession (1949) (based on A Man About a Dog), Two on the Tiles (1951), and Smart Alec (1951) (based on Mr Smart Guy).

Coppel was hired to rewrite some scenes on No Highway in the Sky (1951) starring James Stewart and wrote Mr. Denning Drives North (1951) based on his own novel.

He became the first Australian to receive an Academy Award nomination for screenwriting with The Captain's Paradise, which was nominated for Best Story in 1953. That year he published a novel The Last Parable (1953).

Coppel was used by Warwick Pictures on Hell Below Zero (1954) and The Black Knight (1954); like No Highway and Captain's Paradise they were British films with American stars and Coppel wanted to work in Hollywood.

Move to Hollywood
Coppel moved to Los Angeles in 1954, where he wrote a number of scripts. He did some uncredited work on To Catch a Thief (1955) and did the thriller Appointment with a Shadow (1957). With Samuel A. Taylor, Coppel supplied the screenplay for Vertigo (1958), based on the Boileau-Narcejac novel D'entre les morts.

He wrote the plays The Genius and the Goddess (1957) and The Joshua Tree (1958), and saw The Captain's Paradise adapted into a musical as Oh, Captain! (1958). He had a big hit with  The Gazebo (1959), based on a story by Coppel and his wife; this was later filmed although someone else did the screenplay. Coppel adapted The Captain's Paradise (1961) for stage and did a swashbuckler for MGM Swordsman of Siena (1962).

Later career
He spent the 1960s mostly working in Europe and London. He adapted his own story "Laughs with a Stranger" into Moment to Moment (1966). Coppel did some uncredited work on the script for Taste of Excitement to make it more of a comedy; director Don Sharp, who knew Coppel from Australia, said the writer's work was unhelpful.

Coppel's last two credits were a pair of sex comedies co-written with Denis Norden, The Bliss of Mrs. Blossom and The Statue, based on his play Chip Chip Chip.

He also wrote the plays Not in My Bed, You Don’t (1968), Cadenza and A Bird in the Nest and the TV play A Kiss is Just a Kiss (1971).

Personal life
Coppel died of colon cancer on 22 January 1972, in London.

He was married twice. He is survived by his son Chris Coppel who lives in the UK and continues to represent his father's works.

Partial filmography

Unused screenplays
The Chinese Room
The List of Adrian Messenger

Plays
Short Circuit (1935)
The Stars Foretell (1936)
I Killed the Count (1937)
Let's Pretend (1938) – contributed to book of a revue
Believe it Or Not (1940)
Mr Smart Guy (1941)
Saturday's Child (1946)
My Friend Lester (1947)
A Man About a Dog (1949)
The Genius and the Goddess (1957)
The Joshua Tree (1958) – from a story by Myra and Alec Coppel
Oh, Captain! (1958) – based on his story only
The Gazebo (1959) – from a story by Myra and Alec Coppel
Viva Le Difference (1960)
The Captain's Paradise (1961)
Not in My Bed, You Don’t (1968) – with Myra Coppel
Cadenza (1977)
A Bird in the Nest
Chip, Chip, Chip

TV plays
Guests for Dinner (1956) – episode of Alcoa Theatre
A Kiss is Just a Kiss (1971)

Novels
I Killed the Count (London: Blackie, 1939)
A Man About a Dog (London: George G Harrap and Company Ltd, 1947) (US: Over the Line)
Mr. Denning Drives North (London: George G Harrap & Co Ltd, 1950)
The Last Parable (London: Arthur Baker, 1953)
Moment to Moment (Greenwich: Fawcett Publications, 1966)
Tweedledum and Tweedledee (London: Geoffrey Bles, 1967)

Radio plays
A Rum Affair (1941)
Mr Smart Guy (1941)
Murder Scrapbook (1950)

Unmade projects
Peace in Our Time (1940) – British film

References

External links

Alec Coppel Australian theatre credits at AusStage
Alec Coppel at National Film and Sound Archive

Australian screenwriters
Australian male dramatists and playwrights
Writers from Melbourne
1907 births
1972 deaths
20th-century Australian dramatists and playwrights
20th-century Australian screenwriters
Australian expatriates in the United Kingdom
Australian expatriates in the United States